Mangala is an Indian film produced by S. S. Vasan of Gemini Studios. Filmed in Hindi and Telugu languages, it is a remake of the studio's own Tamil film Mangamma Sabatham (1943). The film stars P. Bhanumathi and Ranjan. The Hindi version, released in 1950 was directed by Vasan while the Telugu version, released a year later on 14 January, was directed by Chandru.

Plot 

Mangala, after being humiliated by a prince, swears revenge by making the prince marry her and have a child who would whip him in court.

Cast 
 P. Bhanumathi as Mangala
 Ranjan as the prince

Production 
Mangala, filmed in Telugu and Hindi languages, is a remake of Gemini Studios' own Tamil film Mangamma Sabatham (1943). While Ranjan reprised his role from the Tamil film, Vasundhara Devi was replaced by P. Bhanumathi. Producer S. S. Vasan directed the Hindi version, and Chandru directed the Telugu version.

Soundtrack 
The music was composed by M. D. Parthasarathy. He worked alone in Telugu, and with E. Shankar Shastri and Balkrishan Kalla in Hindi. The song "Suno Suno Pyare More Sajna" from the Hindi soundtrack is based on "I, Yi, Yi, Yi, Yi (I Like You Very Much)".

"Jhanan Jhanana" – P. Bhanumathi

Release 
The Hindi version of Mangala was released in 1950, and the Telugu version a year later, on 14 January 1951.

References

Bibliography

External links 

1950s Hindi-language films
1950s Telugu-language films
Films directed by S. S. Vasan
Films scored by B. S. Kalla
Films scored by E. Shankar Shastri
Films scored by M. D. Parthasarathy
Gemini Studios films
Hindi remakes of Tamil films
Telugu remakes of Tamil films